Sarıcan is a town (belde) in Karakoçan District, Elazığ Province, Turkey. Its population is 2,173 (2021).

References

Towns in Turkey
Populated places in Elazığ Province
Karakoçan District